In 2020, Shelbourne F.C. competed in the League of Ireland Premier Division for the first time since 2013. They were promoted in the 2019 season, having finished top of the first division. For a second season running, Shelbourne were under the management of Ian Morris. In October 2019, shortly after the end of the previous season, Shelbourne released a new jersey ahead of the 2020 season which emulated the style of the 1960s jersey used by the club. This was part of marking the pending 125th anniversary of the founding of the club.

Overview 
On 12 March the Football Association of Ireland announced the sudden postponement of football under their rule including the League of Ireland premier division due to the COVID-19 pandemic. This meant the postponement of Shelbourne F.C. fixtures too. This was initially set as a postponement until 29 March but was later extended.  Shels finished in 9th position in the league, forcing them into a promotion/relegation play-off with Longford Town. They lost this fixture which condemned them back to the First Division.

League table

Results summary

FAI Cup

Shelbourne received a first round bye. The draw for the second round took place on 12 August 2020 and was broadcast live on the Football Association Ireland Facebook page with Republic of Ireland senior manager Stephen Kenny conducting proceedings.

References 

Shelbourne F.C. seasons
Shelbourne FC